The 4th season of National Cheerleading Championships was the biggest season for NCC so far.  It started with the league's very first regionals for Southern Luzon region, followed by Northern Luzon region, Visayas-Mindanao region, and finally with the National Capital Region.

The season also witnessed the most number of participants in history of the competition for both divisions - high school and college.

National finals
The first true nationals was held at Ynares Sports Arena in Pasig.  Teams qualified from the Regionals come to Manila to compete.

High School division
High School division national finals was held at Ynares Sports Arena in Pasig last March 14, 2009. Teams from Southern Luzon, Northern Luzon, and National Capital Region competed for the national finals. Pasig Catholic College's PCC Crusaders was declared the National Champion for 2009.

College Division
College division national finals was held at Ynares Sports Arena in Pasig last March 15, 2009. Teams from Southern Luzon, Northern Luzon, Visayas-Mindanao region, and National Capital Region competed for the national finals. University of Perpetual Help System Dalta's UPHSD Perpsquad was declared the National Champion for 2009.

Regional Qualifiers

South Luzon
Held at St. Michael's College in Laguna, on September 7, 2008

High school

Legend:

College

Legend:

North Luzon

High school

Legend:

College

Legend:

Visayas-Mindanao

College

Legend:

Metro Manila
Held at Ynares Sports Arena, Pasig on February 28, 2009

High school

Legend:

College

Legend:

Notes

National Cheerleading Championship
Sports in the Philippines
2009 in Philippine sport